Via Apostolica is a missionary district in the Anglican Church of North America (ACNA), comprising five parishes in the Canadian provinces of Alberta, British Columbia, and Saskatchewan. Despite being located in Canada, the missionary district clergy are canonically resident in the Anglican Diocese of the Upper Midwest, in the United States. Its founding bishop is Todd Atkinson, currently on a leave of absence while inhibited from episcopal ministry.

History
Via Apostolica was an independent church movement which started in 2012 and found continuity with the Anglican tradition. Via began partnering with the Anglican Network in Canada (ANiC) in 2014, when their clergy attended the diocese's synod that year. Through the efforts of ANiC's moderator bishop Charlie Masters, Via's bishop Todd Atkinson was welcomed into ACNA's College of Bishops on January 10, 2019. The next year, during ACNA's provincial assembly, a motion was made to admit Via Apostolica as a provincial missionary district. This motion, was overwhelmingly passed on June 24, 2020. One of the main purposes is that their growth will led them to become a full member diocese of ACNA.

The ACNA official website noticed on 5 September 2021, that due to an oingoing investigation on bishop Todd Atkinson, amidst allegations of misconduct, he will be taking a leave of absence. On 16 October 2021, it was announced that during Atkinson's leave of absence, ACNA had appointed as interim bishop of Via Apostolica, Quigg Lawrence, who was until then Suffragan Bishop of the Anglican Diocese of Christ Our Hope. On 6 November 2021, ACNA reported that the provincial investigation of Todd Atkinson had begun. 

In July 2022, an ACNA board of inquiry unanimously determined that "probable cause and reasonable grounds" to present Atkinson for trial for four violations of Canon IV.2.4, which prohibits bishops from "[c]onduct giving just cause for scandal or offense, including the abuse of ecclesiastical power." Atkinson was inhibited pending trial on July 8. On Sept. 13, Atkinson pleaded not guilty to the charges.

On October 6, 2022, Via Apostolica's Bishop's Council announced that all of the missionary district's congregations "have begun official steps of discernment for a new ecclesial home and episcopal oversight" within the ACNA.

References

External links
Via Apostolica Official Website

Anglican Church in North America
Christian organizations established in 2012